"Magic Carpet Ride" is a song by British duo Mighty Dub Katz, which consisted of DJ, musician and record producer Norman Cook and his former flatmate Gareth Hansome (a.k.a. GMoney). It was first released in 1995 and is their biggest hit to date, peaking within the top 10 in Germany, the Netherlands, Spain and Switzerland. The song contains a sample of Chakachas' recording "Yo Soy Cubano" from 1970, and Sandee's recording "Notice Me" from 1988. The male vocals are based on Laid Back's "White Horse". A black-and-white music video was shot to accompany the song.

Critical reception
Larry Flick from Billboard wrote that this "kitchen-sink instrumental from the ever-experimental mind of producer Norman Cook combines elements of disco and merengue-with the occasional splash electro-pop. The end result is a quirky, but endearing jam that will enjoy a nice run on the turntables of adventurous DJs." He also concluded, "File this one under "happy house" and twirl on, children." Pan-European magazine Music & Media described the song as a "Latin house trinket". On the 1997 re-release, Daisy & Havoc from Music Weeks RM Dance Update gave it five out of five, adding, "This brilliant unusual track should be a surprise to very few people – it's been around for years. [...] Presumably they're after a summer hit with this one and it's well deserved – nothing else sounds like it or lasts like it."

Chart performance
"Magic Carpet Ride" enjoyed massive success in both clubs and on the chart all over the world. It peaked at number-one on the RPM Dance/Urban chart in Canada in January 1996, with one week at the top. In Europe, the single charted within the top 10 in Germany, the Netherlands, Spain and Switzerland. In Norway and Austria, it reached the top 20, while it was a top 30 hit in Iceland, Sweden and the UK, where it peaked at number 24 in 1997. On the Eurochart Hot 100, the song reached its highest position as number 33 in March 1996.

Impact and legacy
Tomorrowland voted "Magic Carpet Ride" number 97 in their official list of "The Ibiza 500" in 2020.

Track listing

 12" single, Germany (1995)"Magic Carpet Ride" (Ulti-Mix) – 6:02
"Magic Carpet Ride" (Son of Wilmot Mix) – 7:29

 CD single, Europe (1995)"Magic Carpet Ride" (No Comprende Edit) – 3:50
"Magic Carpet Ride" (Ulti-Edit) – 3:58
"Magic Carpet Ride" (Ulti-Mix) – 6:02
"Magic Carpet Ride" (Son of Wilmot Mix) – 7:29
"Magic Carpet Ride" (Original Version) – 8:06

 CD maxi, Netherlands (1995)"Magic Carpet Ride" (Radio Edit) – 3:52
"Magic Carpet Ride" (Son of Wilmot Mix) – 7:33
"Magic Carpet Ride" (Work Remix) – 6:03
"Magic Carpet Ride" (Original Version) – 8:08

 CD maxi, France (1995)'
"Magic Carpet Ride" (Radio Edit) – 4:30
"Magic Carpet Ride" (Vocoder Club Mix) – 8:13
"Son of Wilmot" (No Comprende Mix) – 7:29

Charts

Weekly charts

Year-end charts

References

1995 songs
1995 singles
Eurodance songs
Latin house songs
English house music songs
Black-and-white music videos